The Seattle Fault is a zone of multiple shallow east–west thrust faults that cross the Puget Sound Lowland and through Seattle (in the U.S. state of Washington) in the vicinity of Interstate Highway 90. The Seattle Fault was first recognized as a significant seismic hazard in 1992, when a set of reports showed that about 1,100 years ago it was the scene of a major earthquake of about magnitude 7 – an event that entered Native American oral legend.  Extensive research has since shown the Seattle Fault to be part of a regional system of faults.

Notable earthquake 

First suspected from mapping of gravitational anomalies in 1965 and an uplifted marine terrace at Restoration Point (foreground in picture above), the Seattle Fault's existence and likely hazard were definitively established by a set of five reports published in Science in 1992.  These reports looked at the timing of abrupt uplift and subsidence around Restoration Point and Alki Point (distant right side of picture), tsunami deposits on Puget Sound, turbidity in lake paleosediments, rock avalanches, and multiple landslides around Lake Washington, and determined that all these happened about 1100 years ago (between 900 and 930 CE), and most likely due to an earthquake of magnitude 7 or greater on the Seattle Fault.

Although the 900–930 CE earthquake was over a thousand years ago, local native legends have preserved an association of a powerful supernatural spirit – a'yahos, noted for shaking, rushes of water, and landsliding – with five locales along the trace of the Seattle Fault, including a "spirit boulder" called Psai-Yah-hus near the Fauntleroy ferry dock in West Seattle.

Geology 

The Seattle Fault is the structural boundary where 50–60 million years old (early Tertiary) basalt of the Crescent Formation on the south has been uplifted – the Seattle Uplift – and is tipping into the Seattle Basin, where the Tertiary bedrock is buried under at least  of relatively softer, lighter sedimentary strata of the younger Blakeley and Blakely Harbor formations. Most of the faulting is "blind" (not reaching the surface), and generally difficult to locate because of heavy vegetation or development. Three principal strands have been identified, their location determined by high-resolution seismic reflection and aeromagnetic surveys. The northernmost strand lies nearly along Interstate 90 and then under Lake Sammamish. The central section of the fault zone – where it crosses the apparent location of the Olympic–Wallowa Lineament – shows marked variation in the location of the strands and of the underlying structure, but the nature and significance of this is not understood.

The fault extends for approximately 70 km (43 miles) from near Fall City on the east, where it appears to be terminated by the South Whidbey Island Fault, to Hood Canal on the west (not shown on the map). However, boundaries defining the western termination zone is currently unclear (see Puget Sound faults#Question of western termination).  It is the northern edge of the Seattle Uplift, of which the Tacoma Fault is the southern edge.  One model has the Seattle and Tacoma faults converging at depth to form a wedge, which is being popped up by approximately north–south oriented compression that ultimately derives from plate tectonics.  Another model (see diagram) interprets the Seattle Uplift as a sheet of rock that is being forced up a ramp.  Subsequent work suggests that the structure of the Seattle Fault may vary from east to west, with both models being applicable in different sections.  A later model has part of the north-thrusting sheet forming a wedge between the sedimentary formations of the Seattle Basin and the underlying bedrock.

The Seattle Fault is believed to date from about 40 million years ago (late Eocene).  This is about the time that the strike-slip movement on the north-striking Straight Creek Fault to the east ceased, due to the intrusions of plutons.  It appears that when the Straight Creek Fault became stuck the north–south compressive force that it had accommodated by strike-slip motion was transferred to the crust of the Puget Lowland, which subsequently folded and faulted, and the various blocks jammed over one another.

Other scarps associated with the Seattle fault have been identified by LIDAR-based mapping; trenching has generally shown the faulting to be more complex than was first realized. Many of the details of the Seattle Fault, including recurrence rate, remain to be resolved.  A study of sediments in Lake Washington found evidence of seven large (M > 7) earthquakes in the last 3500 years.

Surface scarps due to faulting are rarely observed in this area (due to topography, vegetation, and urbanization); a rare exception can be seen at Mee Kwa Mooks Park south of Alki Point. This is the site of the West Seattle Fault; the prominent rise there is due to uplift on the north side of the fault.

Hazard 

The Seattle Fault (and the related Tacoma Fault) is not the only source of earthquake hazard in the Puget Lowland. Other faults in the near surface continental crust, such as the South Whidbey Island Fault (near Everett), and the yet to be studied Olympia Fault (near Olympia), though historically quiescent, are suspected of generating earthquakes of around magnitude 7. And there are the infrequent but very powerful great subduction events, such as the magnitude 9 1700 Cascadia earthquake, where the entire Cascadia subduction zone, from Cape Mendocino to Vancouver Island, slips.

But the Seattle and Tacoma faults are probably the most serious earthquake threat to the populous Seattle–Tacoma area.  A 2002 study of bridge vulnerability estimated that a magnitude 7 earthquake on the Seattle Fault would damage approximately 80 bridges in the Seattle–Tacoma area,  whereas a magnitude 9 subduction event would damage only around 87 bridges in all of Western Washington. The same study also found that with failure of just six bridges (the minimum damage for a Benioff M 6.5 event) there could be at least $3 billion lost in business revenue alone.  Subsequent retrofitting by the Washington Department of Transportation and the City of Seattle would likely reduce damage to key bridges. But there is concern that such an earthquake on the Seattle Fault would devastate unreinforced masonry (URM) buildings, of which the City of Seattle is estimated to have around a thousand, concentrated in Capitol Hill, Pioneer Square, and the International District.

Other recent work indicates that the Seattle Fault can generate two types of earthquakes; both pose "considerable hazard" to the Seattle metropolitan region.  The A.D. 900–930 earthquake is believed to be the only instance in the past 7,000 years of the type that causes a regional uplift.  The other type is more localized and shallower (and therefore more damaging); at least four such events are believed to have occurred in the past 3,000 years on the west end of the fault. (The history of the central and eastern segments is not known.)

Calculations based on fault length and paleoseismological studies show that the Seattle Fault can generate a very damaging magnitude 7.0 earthquake. The modeling shows that such a tsunami would also inundate the industrial areas on Commencement Bay 30 miles south (Tacoma) and low-lying areas on the Puyallup River delta. There is also concern that a severe or prolonged event could cause failure of the Duwamish or Puyallup River deltas, where the main port facilities for Seattle and Tacoma are located (Harbor Island and Commencement Bay).

See also 
Geology of the Pacific Northwest
Tacoma Fault

Notes

Sources

Further reading

External links 
 USGS Professional Paper 1560: Assessing Earthquake Hazards and Reducing Risk in the Pacific Northwest Technical, but readable.  And has many good pictures.
  USGS: Reducing Earthquake Hazards in the Pacific Northwest
 USGS: Earthquake ground motion movies
 
 Scenario for a Magnitude 6.7 Earthquake on the Seattle Fault  Vivid and comprehensive.
 Washington State's Bridge Seismic Retrofit Program
 Earthquake Study: Four Vashon-Specific Scenarios Considerations for all islands.
 Puget Sound Tsunami Inundation Modeling (NOAA)
 Elliott Bay inundation map (DNR)
 Tsunami Hazard Map of the Elliott Bay Area (NOAA)
 Additional inundation maps (DNR Publications)
 Puget Sound Lidar Consortium Use of Lidar for locating faults.

Geography of Seattle
Seismic faults of Washington (state)
Buried rupture earthquakes